A fish steak, alternatively known as a fish cutlet, is a cut of fish which is cut perpendicular to the spine and can either include the bones or be boneless. Fish steaks can be contrasted with fish fillets, which are cut parallel to either side of the spine and do not include the larger bones. In contrast to other vertebrate animals, over 85% of the fish body is made up of consumable muscle.

Fish steaks from particularly large fish can be sectioned so they are boneless. It takes less time to make a fish steak than a fillet, because steaks are often bone in and skin on. Cutting through the backbone with a knife can be difficult, so it is preferable to use a butchers saw to make fish steaks. Larger fish, such as tuna, swordfish, salmon, cod and mahi-mahi, are often cut into steaks. 

Fish steaks can be grilled, pan-fried, broiled or baked. While beef steak takes time to cook and can be tough, fish cooks rapidly, is tender, and tends to fall apart. Fish steaks are less likely to fall apart than fish fillets. Unlike beef steak, fish steaks are often baked in a sauce.

See also
 Beefsteak
 List of steak dishes

Notes

References
 Green, Aliza (2010) The Fishmonger's Apprentice: The Expert's Guide to Selecting, Preparing, and Cooking a World of Seafood, Taught by the Masters pp.78–83, Quarry Books. .

Fish dishes
Steak